Raseglurant (INN) (code name ADX-10059) is a negative allosteric modulator of the mGlu5 receptor and derivative of MPEP which was under development by Addex Therapeutics for the treatment of migraine, gastroesophageal reflux disease, and dental anxiety. It reached phase II clinical trials for all of the aforementioned indications before being discontinued due to the observation of possible predictive signs of hepatotoxicity in patients with long-term use.

See also
 Basimglurant
 Dipraglurant
 Fenobam
 Mavoglurant

References

External links
 Development of ADX10059 Ended for Long-term Use - Addex Therapeutics

MGlu5 receptor antagonists
Fluoroarenes
Aminopyridines
Alkyne derivatives